Woodmancote may refer to more than one place in England:

Gloucestershire
 Woodmancote, Dursley, a village
 Woodmancote, Cirencester, a village
 Woodmancote, Tewkesbury Borough, a village and civil parish

West Sussex
 Woodmancote, Chichester District, a village
 Woodmancote, Horsham District, a village and civil parish